The John W. Young Round Barn is an historic building located near Traer in rural Tama County, Iowa, United States. It was built in 1917 by Joe Seda as a general purpose barn. The building is a true round barn that measures  in diameter. It has been listed on the National Register of Historic Places since 1986.

References

Infrastructure completed in 1917
Buildings and structures in Tama County, Iowa
National Register of Historic Places in Tama County, Iowa
Barns on the National Register of Historic Places in Iowa
Round barns in Iowa